Many Canadian politicians have run for office with more than one party. This is a list of some.

 MPs are Members of Parliament of Canada
 MPPs are Members of Provincial Parliament of Ontario
 MNAs are Members of the National Assembly of Quebec
 MHAs are Members of the House of Assembly of Newfoundland and Labrador
 MLAs are Members of the Legislative Assembly of other provinces

Conservative parties

"Tories" denotes members of the Progressive Conservative Party and its predecessor parties, the Canadian Alliance and the modern Conservative Party.

Tories/other provincial conservative parties to Liberals
Eve Adams - Conservative MP for Mississauga—Brampton South joined the Liberals on February 9, 2015 after conflicts over her attempts to be nominated as a Conservative leave her without a riding to stand in for the next federal election.
Pierre-Michel Auger - elected as Action démocratique du Québec MNA, crossed over to Quebec Liberal Party in 2008.
Leo Barry - Newfoundland Progressive Conservative MHA in the 1970s and 1980s, Energy Minister under Frank Moores and Brian Peckford, crossed the floor to join the Newfoundland Liberal Party in 1984, served as Liberal leader from 1985 until 1987.
Ken Boshcoff - Liberal MP 2004+ Thunder Bay-Rainy River, former Mayor of Thunder Bay, ran for the PCs in 1984 
Lise Bourgault - PC MP in the 1980s ran for the Liberals in the 2000 election.
Scott Brison - First openly gay Progressive Conservative MP, Kings Hants 1997–1998, (gave up seat for than leader Joe Clark to run), 2000–2003. He ran for the PC leadership in June 2003, coming in 3rd. He quit the new Conservatives in late 2003 over their far right wing agenda, saying "... while they figure out ways to privatize the sidewalk."
Gary Carr - Ontario PC MPP Oakville 1995–2003 / Liberal MP Halton 2004+ ; This former NHL hockey player and former Speaker of the House for the Ontario Legislature publicly rebuffed, and quit the Tories over the lack of integrity and waste caused by the Harris/Eves governments.
Jean Charest - Federal Progressive Conservative leader 1994–1998, left the federal PC for the Liberal Party of Quebec then became Premier of Quebec under that banner (2003–2012)
Ron Evans -  Grand Chief of the Assembly of Manitoba Chiefs, ran for the Manitoba PCs in 1999, later switched to the Liberals in 2000, running as the Liberal candidate for Churchill in 2004.
John Herron - PC MP for New Brunswick, quit the new conservatives, to run for the Liberals and subsequantely lost to the Conservative candidate.
Jack Horner - PC MP, switched to Liberals in 1977.
David Kilgour - former PC MP from Alberta, switched to being a Liberal MP in early 1990s over the Mulroney Government introducing the GST.
Ricardo Lopez - former PC MP and Canadian Alliance candidate, nominated for the federal Liberals in 2008 but stepped down.
Nancy MacBeth – former PC MLA, & came in second PC leadership in 1990 to Ralph Klein.  Later quit the PCs and became leader of the Alberta Liberals.
Keith Martin - Reform/Alliance MP, left the new Conservatives soon after they formed to become a Liberal.
Bill Matthews - PC MP elected in 1997. Switched to Liberals in 1999, but consequently lost the liberal nomination for the riding. Ran in another riding.
Hubert Meilleur - former President of the ADQ, ran for the PLQ in 2007 and 2008.
Claude Morin - former ADQ MNA, ran for the federal Liberals in the 2011 election.
Bridget Pastoor - Alberta Liberal MLA elected in 2004, had previously supported the Tories under Lougheed.
Joe Peschisolido  - Ran for Alliance in 1997 in Etobicoke North. Alliance MP Richmond BC 2000–2002, joined the Liberals 28 January 2002. He lost the 2004 nomination to person he had previously beat, Raymond Chan.
Andre Riedl - elected as Action démocratique du Québec MNA, crossed over to Quebec Liberal Party in 2008.
Dimitri Soudas, former Executive Director of the Conservative Party of Canada and former Communications Director to Conservative Prime Minister Stephen Harper reportedly brokered the 2015 defection of his fiancée, Conservative MP Eve Adams, to the Liberal Party and switched his party allegiances as well.
Belinda Stronach - Conservative Leadership candidate and MP elect in 2004, switched to liberals in 2005 in exchange for a cabinet position.
Garth Turner - former PC/Conservative MP, switched to the Liberal Party after being kicked out of the Conservative Party
Jack Volrich - Federal PC candidate in 1984, organized for the Liberals in 1993.
Mark Warner - former Conservative candidate for Toronto Centre, he was removed by Stephen Harper.  He later endorsed Liberal candidate Bob Rae.
Marianne Wilkinson - former head of the Progressive Conservatives Women's Council and former Mayor of Kanata, Ontario Liberal candidate for Lanark-Carleton in the 2003 election.  (She has now joined something called the Patriot Party.)

Tories to Co-operative Commonwealth Federation/New Democratic Party
John Edzerza - Yukon Party MLA 2002–2006, switched to the Yukon NDP in 2006 and ran as their candidate
David MacDonald - United Church Minister, PC MP Prince/Egmont 1965–1980, Rosedale 1988–1993.  Ran for NDP in Toronto-Centre Rosedale in 1997 federal election.
Donald C. MacDonald - a Conservative Party supporter in his youth, switched to the CCF in the 1930s as a result of the Great Depression and became a CCF organizer, candidate, and Ontario CCF/NDP leader in the 1950s and 1960s and remained an MPP until the 1980s.
Dr. Hinrich Bitter-Suermann - Liver transplant surgeon, born in 1940 in Berlin, Germany. Resided in Chester Basin, N.S. since 1982. Elected as a Progressive Conservative MLA in Chester- St. Margarets in 1998, but disagreed with the party's decision to support the Liberal budget and crossed the floor to join the NDP. He ran for Nova Scotia NDP leadership in 2000. He lost to the PC candidate in the 1999 Nova Scotia election, and again by approximately 200 votes in 2003.
Robert Toupin - Quebec PC MP for Terrebonne, switched to NDP in 1986, then to Independent in 1987.
Sandra Jansen - Alberta Progressive Conservative Party MLA, switched to NDP in 2016.

Tories to Greens
Jim Harris - Leader of the Green Party of Canada (2003–2006).  A former Progressive Conservative member in the early 1980s.
Rafe Mair - former BC Social Credit MLA and now radio host. Now a Green Party supporter.
Douglas Roche - former PC MP and Senator, endorsed Green Party in the 2008 federal election.
David Scrymgeour – former (and first) Executive Director of the Conservative Party of Canada. Served as campaign director for Jim Flaherty's Ontario PC leadership bid before switching to the Green Party.

Tories/other provincial conservative parties to Bloc/Parti Québécois
Rodrigue Biron - Union Nationale leader, elected as a PQ MNA, later ran for the BQ.
Lucien Bouchard – Quebec Premier 1996–2001 / PC MP under the Mulroney government, elected in 1988, then created the federal version of the Parti Québécois, the Bloc Québécois, leader of the Bloc to 1996, before becoming Premier of Quebec.
Gilbert Chartrand - Tory MP for Verdun—Saint-Paul from 1984, left the PCs in 1990 to serve as an independent and then joined the BQ when it was founded, rejoined the Progressive Conservatives in 1991, retired in 1993.
Antonio Flamand - Union Nationale MNA, later ran for PQ.
François Gérin - PC MP elected for Mégantic—Compton—Stanstead in 1984. Left the PCs in 1990 to become an Independent and then a founding member of the BQ. Retired in 1993.
Nic LeBlanc - PC MP 1984–1992 for Longueuil, than become Bloc MP 1992–1997. Ran for Canadian Alliance in 2000, and Conservatives in 2004.
Marcel Masse - former PC cabinet minister, joined PQ in the 1990s and served in a number of government positions.
Louis Plamondon - PC MP Bas-Richelieu—Nicolet—Bécancour from 1984 until 1990. Left PCs with Bouchard to become an Independent and then a founding member of the BQ. Re-elected as BQ in 1993, 1997, 2000, 2004, 2006, 2008 and 2011.
Jérôme Proulx - Union Nationale MNA, later ran for PQ.
Benoît Tremblay - PC MP for Rosemont—La Petite-Patrie elected in 1988. Left PCs with Bouchard after the failure of Meech Lake to sit as Independent. Founding member of the BQ. Re-elected in 1993, retired in 1997.
Pierrette Venne - PC MP Saint Hubert 1988–1991, BQ 1991–2004.

Tories to other
Richard Holden - Ran as a PC candidate in 1979 federal election, elected as a MNA for the Equality Party, crossed the floor to join the Parti Québécois

Tories to none/no public support

Rick Borotsik - Manitoba PC MP from 1997 to 2004 for Brandon, quit the new merged Conservatives over Harper's right wing views.  He later became a Manitoba PC MLA.
Joe Clark - former Prime Minister of Canada and two-time leader of Progressive Conservatives,
Flora MacDonald - former "Red Tory" PC MP, leadership candidate and cabinet minister. MacDonald voted for the New Democrats in the 2004 election.

One conservative party to another
Rob Anderson - Alberta MLA, crossed the floor from Alberta PCs to Wildrose Alliance in 2010.
Joe Anglin MLA (Rimbey-Rocky Mountain House-Sundre) quit the Wildrose Alliance caucus to sit as an Independent MLA on November 3, 2014, stating that he had found out he was out to be expelled due to his public criticisms of the party leader's advisers. In January 2015, he announced that he will be seeking the Progressive Conservative nomination in his riding; the nomination meeting is to be held February 21, 2015. Updated refer to  versus.
Jan Brown - Reform MP for Calgary Southeast Jan Brown became a PC in June 1997.
Craig Chandler - social conservative, has at different times either run for, or supported, the Social Credit Party, the Reform Party, the Progressive Conservative Party, the Conservative Party, and the Alberta Alliance/Wildrose Alliance.
Hugh Curtis - BC PC MLA, crossed floor to the Socreds, serving in a variety of government posts.
Douglas Edmondson - served as leader of the Manitoba Confederations of Regions Party, had previously been a Progressive Conservative.
Jake Epp - federal PC cabinet minister, later joined Canadian Alliance.
Ernie Eves - Premier of Ontario and supporter of the Progressive Conservative Party of Canada, briefly took a membership in the Canadian Alliance to support Tom Long's leadership bid before returning to the federal PCs.
Heather Forsyth -  Alberta MLA, crossed the floor from Alberta PCs to Wildrose Alliance in 2010.
John A. Gamble, PC MP, sought Reform Party nomination in 1993.
Jim Jones - Elected as a PC, joined Canadian Alliance.
Peter Kaufmann - Winnipeg municipal politician, supported federal PCs before switching to Canadian Alliance in 2000.
Preston Manning - Reform Party founder, ran for the Social Credit Party of Canada in the 1960s.
Brian Pallister - former Manitoba PC cabinet minister, ran as federal PC candidate, later elected as a Canadian Alliance MP.
William Shaw - former Union Nationale MNA and federal Progressive Conservative, later ran for the Equality Party and the Canadian Alliance.
Danielle Smith, leader of the Wildrose Alliance and eight members of her caucus: Rob Anderson, Gary Bikman, Rod Fox, Jason Hale, Bruce McAllister, Blake Pedersen, Bruce Rowe and Jeff Wilson announced on December 17, 2014 that they were crossing the floor to join the governing Alberta PC party's caucus.
Larry Spencer, former Alliance MP, removed from caucus for controversial social views, ran in 2004 election as independent, now a member of the Christian Heritage Party, serving as interim president.
Kerry Towle, MLA (Innisfail-Sylvan Lake), and Ian Donovan MLA, (Little Bow) left the Wildrose Alliance to join the ruling Alberta PC Party's caucus on November 24, 2014.
Gaston Tremblay - Union Nationale MNA, crossed over to the Ralliement créditiste du Québec
Trueman Tuck - ran for the Freedom Party of Ontario, later leader of Republican Party of Ontario.

Liberal parties

Liberals to Tories/other provincial conservative parties
Jean Allaire - former Quebec Liberal Party member, first leader of the Action démocratique du Québec.
Leona Alleslev - Liberal MP for Aurora—Oak Ridges—Richmond Hill, switched to the Conservative Party on September 17, 2018.
Bob Bjornerud - Saskatchewan Liberal MLA, helped form the Saskatchewan Party.
John Bryden - Liberal MP Ancaster-Dundas-Flamborough-Aldershot 1993-2004 - He quit the Liberals over integrity issues and that he believed that the cities shouldn't get any money from the federal government.  He sought the New Conservative Party Nomination for Ancaster-Dundas-Flamborough-Aldershot and lost.
Lawrence Cannon - former Quebec Liberal Cabinet Minister, Candidate for Conservatives in Pontiac in 2005 federal election.
Annamarie Castrilli - Ontario Liberal MPP elected in 1995 for Downsview. Switch to the PCs, and ran for them in another riding in 1999, losing badly.
Joe Comuzzi – former Liberal MP, switched to the Conservatives over Same-Sex Marriage 
Anne Cools - anti-poverty and housing advocate, Toronto Centre-Rosedale candidate in 1980, appointed by Pierre Trudeau to the Senate in 1984.  As a senator, she switched over to the Conservatives on Tuesday June 8, 2004.
John Crosbie - Liberal Newfoundland MHA, switched to Newfoundland PCs, then PC MP, outspoken finance minister for Joe Clark's government.
June Draude - Saskatchewan Liberal MLA, helped form the Saskatchewan Party.
Mario Dumont - former head of Quebec Liberal Party youth wing, helped found and later led Action démocratique du Québec
David Emerson - Liberal MP and cabinet Minister elected in 2004 for Vancouver Kingsway, switched parties before even being sworn into his seat.  Switched to Conservatives 6 February 2006 so he could keep his cabinet job.
Rod Gantefoer - Saskatchewan Liberal MLA, helped form the Saskatchewan Party.
Raminder Gill - Ontario PC MPP 1999–2003, he was initially a Liberal, but after losing the 1993 federal Liberal nomination to Gurbax Malhi he became a Conservative.
Stephen Harper - said he used to be a Trudeau Liberal and was involved in a Young Liberals group as a youth
Paul Hellyer - former Liberal MP.  He was invited by Federal Progressive Conservative Leader Robert Stansfield to join, and accepted.  He later quit over Free Trade and started a new party, Canadian Action Party.  He has recently sought to merge the Canadian Action Party with the New Democratic Party.
Rahim Jaffer - Reform/Alliance/Conservative MP for Edmonton Strathcona, said he used to be a liberal (Source - CBC Newsworld, Cross Country Checkup Edmonton Strathcona candidates debate, Sunday June 6, 2004)
Wajid Khan - 2007 - switched from Liberal MP to Conservative MP after his appointment as special advisor to Prime Minister Stephen Harper on the Middle East and Afghanistan after Liberal leader Stéphane Dion ordered Khan to terminate his relationship with Harper.
Ralph Klein - a Liberal supporter until 1988 federal election when he endorsed the federal Mulroney Tories. Was elected to the Alberta legislature as a Tory in 1989 and became Premier in 1992.
Ken Krawetz - Saskatchewan Liberal MLA, helped form the Saskatchewan Party.
Gérard Latulippe - Quebec Liberal MNA and Cabinet Minister in the 1980s, ran for Canadian Alliance in 2000.
Robert Layton - Liberal Party organizer in Quebec, switched to the Tories in the early 1980s and was elected to the House of Commons in 1984 as a Tory MP, appointed to cabinet.
Sylvie Lespérance - former Quebec Liberal Party candidate, elected in a by-election for the ADQ.
Joseph McEwen - Ontario Liberal MPP for Frontenac—Addington 1975–1984, switched to Ontario PC in 1984 then lost
Tim Peterson - Ontario Liberal MPP for Mississauga South elected in 2003, left the Liberals to sit as an independent in 2007, and ran for the Ontario PC party in the 2007 election.
Marvin Shore - Ontario Liberal MPP for London North 1975–1976, switched to Tories 1976–1977 then lost.  His son is writer/producer David Shore.
Stephen Woodworth - Kitchener Centre MP, ran for the Liberals in Waterloo in the 1988 election

Liberals to Social Credit
Jack Davis - federal Liberal cabinet minister, later served as a Socred provincial cabinet minister in BC.
Bill Vander Zalm - ran for federal Liberals in 1968 and the BC Liberals in the early 1970s, he later became BC Premier under Social Credit.

Liberals to New Democratic Party
Jean Allard - Manitoba Liberal candidate for Rupertsland in 1966. He won the riding of Churchill for the NDP in 1969. He quit the NDP in 1972 to sit as an independent.
Linda Asper -  sister of Israel Asper (Founder of Global, Manitoba Liberal Party Leader 1970–1975), ran for Manitoba Liberals in 1990, NDP MLA 1999–2003 then resigning to take up an international job position.
Buckley Belanger - Saskatchewan Liberal MLA elect in 1995.  He switched to the NDP and a by-election was held in 1998 where he was re-elected as a New Democrat.
Françoise Boivin - Liberal MP for Gatineau 2003–2006; re-elected for the same riding as a New Democrat in 2011.
Thérèse Casgrain - First leader of Quebec CCF, had previously been a Liberal.
Richard Cashin - from Liberal MP from Newfoundland in the 1960s, later Newfoundland NDP President in the 1970s
Alex Cullen - Ontario MPP Elected in a by-election in Ottawa West in 1997, switch to the NDP in November 1998 after losing the nomination to the brother of the Mayor of Ottawa. He lost in the 1999 election.
Laurent Desjardins - Manitoba Liberal MLA for St. Boniface, who decided to support the minority NDP government in 1969 to stop any attempts of the Liberals, Progressive Conservative and Social Credit of trying to create a coalition government. He official joined the NDP in 1972.
Dennis Drainville - former Ontario NDP MPP 1990–1993, ran for Ontario Liberals in 1981 in Riverdale
Sam Drover - Liberal MHA Newfoundland 1949–1955. He switched to the CCF, become the 1st CCF-NDP in Newfoundland. He became the leader, but he lost his seat and the party won no ridings.
Pauline Jewett - Liberal MP from 1963 to 1965. Quit party over the implementation of the War Measures Act in 1970. Moved to British Columbia and sat as an NDP MP from 1979 to 1988.
Jack Layton - former head of the Liberal Party Quebec Youth Wing; joined the NDP in the 1970s. Federal NDP Leader (2003–2011).
Alexa McDonough - worked for the Nova Scotia Liberals in the 1970 provincial election. Was disappointed by the Gerald Regan government and switched to the NDP to work on the 1974 federal election campaign of her father Lloyd R. Shaw. Subsequently, ran for the NDP, became provincial NDP leader in 1980 and federal leader in the 1990s.
Jim Melenchuk - Saskatchewan Liberal MLA, switched to Independent to maintain spot in cabinet but would run in the 2003 election as an NDP candidate.
Thomas Mulcair - former Quebec Liberal environment minister, later became the NDP MP for Outremont and federal NDP leader.
Ron Osika - Saskatchewan Liberal MLA, switched to Independent to maintain spot in cabinet but would run in the 2003 election as an NDP candidate.
Gordon Wilson - former BC Liberal Leader ; Was defeated in a snap BC liberal leadership contest because of him having a committing Adultery with a fellow liberal MLA.  He left to start his own party, the Progressive Democratic Alliance, winning his own seat. He later joined the NDP and ran for its leadership. He lost the leadership race and his seat in 2001.

Liberals to Greens
Deborah Coyne - Liberal candidate in Toronto—Danforth for the 2006 federal election; sought the Liberal nomination unsuccessfully in Don Valley West and Ottawa West—Nepean. Ran for the Liberal Party leadership in 2013. Mother of Pierre Trudeau's daughter and Justin Trudeau's half-sister. Joined the Greens in February 2015 to become senior policy adviser to party leader Elizabeth May.
Blair Wilson - elected as a Liberal MP in 2006, left the Liberal caucus after being accused of financial impropriety, joined the Green Party on August 30, 2008, becoming its first ever Member of Parliament.

Liberals to Bloc/Parti Québécois
Gaston Gourde, former Liberal Party MP, contested 1998 Quebec election as a PQ candidate and 2011 federal election as a Bloc candidate.
René Lévesque - Quebec Liberal MNA and Cabinet minister, quit in 1967 to become an independent MNA, co-founded the Parti Québécois in 1968.
Gilles Rocheleau -  Hull-Aylmer, elected as a Liberal in 1988, than switched to the Bloc, and lost under the Bloc banner in 1993.

Liberals to others
Thomas Crerar - Liberal-Unionist, later became leader of the Progressive Party of Canada, returned to Liberal Party.
Robert Forke - former Liberal, became Progressive Party of Canada leader, later returned to Liberals.
Mel Hurtig - former Federal Liberal Candidate in Alberta (Edmonton West) in 1972, started National Party to stop free trade.
Donald Pennell - Ontario Liberal Party candidate in 1975 election, first leader of the Family Coalition Party in 1987.
Dave Taylor - Alberta MLA switched affiliation from Liberal to Independent in April 2010.

New Democratic Party

CCF/NDP to Liberal

Jeremy Akerman – former Nova Scotia NDP Leader (1968-1980) and MLA (1970-1980); switched to Liberals in 1981 and ran in a Nova Scotia provincial by-election for them
Hazen Argue – CCF MP 1945–1961, CCF leader 1960–1961, lost the NDP leadership in 1961, and out of bitterness later that year joined the liberals as an MP from 1961 to 1963. As a Senator, he was part of the Trudeau Cabinet (1980–1982) when no Liberals MPs were elected west of Winnipeg. He was a Liberal senator from 1966 to 1988 when charges for fraud were brought against him, but he died before they could be brought to trial.
Chris Axworthy – former NDP MP in the 1980s, and MLA/Cabinet Minister for Saskatchewan NDP in the 1990s, and Saskatchewan NDP leadership candidate in 2000, ran for Federal Liberals in 2004 and 2006 election
Bill Barlee – former NDP MLA/Cabinet Minister in B.C., federal Liberal candidate in 2000 election for Kootenay-Boundary-Okanagan (Source - Public Record; Elections Canada)
Joan Beatty – former Saskatchewan NDP MLA and Cabinet Minister, later became the Liberal candidate for Desnethé-Missinippi-Churchill River in the 2008 by-election.
Buckley Belanger - former Saskatchewan NDP MLA for the riding of Athabasca, was elected as a member of the Liberal Party and then quit to join the NDP. Left the NDP in 2021 to run for the federal election as a member of the Liberal Party for the riding of Desnethé—Missinippi—Churchill River.
Michel Bissonnet - active in the federal and provincial NDP wings in Quebec, later Quebec Liberal Party MNA and President of the National Assesmbly.
Elmer Buchanan - Agriculture minister in the Ontario NDP government of Bob Rae (1990–1995). Left the NDP in 2006 to support Rae's bid to lead the Liberal Party of Canada. Appointed by the provincial Liberal government to serve as vice chair of the Ontario Farm Products and Marketing Commission.
Raymond Cho - Toronto city councillor, ran for federal NDP in 1988, subsequently unsuccessfully sought the provincial and Liberal nominations, ran for the Ontario Progressive Conservatives in 2013 and again in a 2016 by-election.
True Davidson - former Mayor of East York, was a CCF candidate a few times, but later became in Liberal in the 1970s
Ujjal Dosanjh - former NDP Premier of B.C./Liberal MP Surrey? 2004+ - He was appointed by Paul Martin to be a candidate. When asked why he quit, he said that the provincial New Democrats in B.C., and the federal Liberals both had his same views.
Lillian Dyck - former NDP member, sat in the Senate as "Independent New Democrat", joined Liberals in 2009.
Eric Fairclough - former Yukon NDP Leader and Yukon NDP MLA switched to the Liberals in 2006.
Tarek Fateh - prominent NDP organizer and past candidate became a Liberal in 2006.
Kevin Flynn - Liberal MPP Oakville, ran for Ontario NDP in 1985 in Oakville.
Eugene Forsey - founding member and long-time organizer of the CCF, president of the CCF in Quebec and a federal CCF candidate in Ottawa in 1948 and 1949. Left shortly after the creation of the NDP in 1961 because of the new party's view on Quebec. Appointed to the Senate as a Liberal in 1970.
Henri-François Gautrin - Leader of the Quebec NDP, elected as a provincial Liberal.
Rosemary Godin - NDP MLA in Nova Scotia Sackville-Beaver Bank 1998–1999, ran provincially for Liberals in Dartmouth North in 2003.
Barbara Hall - former Mayor of Toronto, ran for Ontario NDP in 1985 in St. David riding of Toronto
Elijah Harper - Manitoba NDP MLA for Rupertsland 1981–1992, Liberal MP for Churchill 1993–1997.
Norman Jamison - Ontario NDP MPP Norfolk 1990–1995, website Rabble.ca says he's a liberal
Rick Laliberte - elected for NDP in 1997 for Churchill River, switched to Liberals just before 2000 election, in September 2000. He won, but became an independent, losing in 2004.
Laurier Lapierre - co-host of This Hour Has Seven Days, NDP candidate in 1968, later Liberal Senator and the first openly gay Senator in Canada
Anthony Lupusella - Ontario NDP MPP 1975–1986 for Dovercourt, switched to Liberals from 1986 to 1990 after losing the NDP nomination for the riding.
Paul MacEwan - Nova Scotia NDP MLA in the 1970s, ran 4 times as NDP (1967-1970-1974-1978), once as independent (1981), then he started the Cape Breaton Labour Party and ran once (1984), then again as independent (1988), then three times as a Liberal. (1993-1998-1999)
Giorgio Mammoliti - Ontario NDP MPP for Yorkview 1990–1995, Toronto City Councillor 1997-now, slowly became alienated from the NDP, and as he moved towards right wing liberals (e.g., Liberals for Tory, John Tory Mayor campaign, instead of liberal Barbara Hall).  He has recently become the butt of jokes from the local alternative weekly newspapers in Toronto.
Gary McRobb - Yukon NDP MLA switched to the Liberals in May 2006.
Doug Moffatt - NDP MPP for Durham East, later ran twice for the federal Liberals.
Glen Murray - former Mayor of Winnipeg, originally a New Democrat but ran for the Liberals in 2004 federal election.
Dave Neumann - former Ontario Liberal MPP for Brantford, previous ran for the Ontario NDP.
John Nunziata - a York City Councillor at the time, He quit the NDP after losing the NDP nomination for the 1982 York South by-election to Ontario NDP leader-elect Bob Rae.
Jackie Pement - former BC NDP Cabinet Minister, gave vocal support to Gordon Campbell (Source - BC Liberals 2001 Election Website)
Elmore Philpott - left the Liberals to join the Co-operative Commonwealth Federation in the 1930s becoming Ontario CCF President. Left the party to become an independent, moved to British Columbia and was elected a Liberal MP from 1953 to 1957.
Bob Rae - Former NDP MP (1978-1982), leader of the Ontario NDP (1982-1996) and NDP Premier of Ontario (1990-1995); left the NDP in 2002 citing Svend Robinson's "behaviour" towards Israel (National Post); subsequently ran as a candidate in the 2006 Liberal Party of Canada leadership election, became a Liberal MP (2008-2013) and became interim Liberal leader from 2011 to 2013.
David Ramsay - Ontario NDP MPP Timiskaming 1985–1986 / Ontario Liberal MPP Timiskaming 1986–2000, and Ontario Liberal MPP Timiskaming/Cochrane 2000+ - He was elected as an NDP MPP in 1985 when Ontario elected a Liberal minority government, and he became a member of the joint party cabinet. In 1986 he switched to the Peterson Liberals. As of 2006, he is currently the Ontario Minister for Northern Resources.
Rathika Sitsabaiesan - NDP MP for Scarborough—Rouge River from 2011 to 2015, switched to Ontario Liberal Party in April 2016 to unsuccessfully run for the party's nomination for a provincial by-election in Scarborough—Rouge River.
Reid Scott - Ontario CCF MPP for Beaches (Toronto) from 1948 to 1952 and NDP MP for Danforth from 1962 to 1968 joined the Liberal Party in 2008 at the age of 82.
Lise St-Denis - switched to the federal Liberals on January 10, 2012, saying in French to explain her move: "Voters voted for Jack Layton. Jack Layton is dead."
Paul Summerville - prominent economist, NDP star candidate in 2006 election in St. Paul's, left NDP to support Bob Rae's leadership bid.
Ross Thatcher - former CCF (NDP) MP in Saskatchewan, became a Liberal, and later Premier of Saskatchewan for the Liberals
Glenn Thibeault - NDP MP for Sudbury resigns his seat in 2014 in order to be appointed the Ontario Liberal Party's candidate in a provincial by-election, which he subsequently won.
Peter Trites - NDP MLA Saint John's Champlain 1984 (byelection)-1987 (switch to Liberals for 1987 election, NDP lost)
Pierre Trudeau - former Prime Minister of Canada, was outraged by then Liberal Leader/Prime Minister Lester Pearson flip-flop on Canada becoming a nuclear power, he endorsed the NDP and was an organizer for NDP candidate Charles Taylor, a University Professor/Philosopher.
Dan Waters - Ontario NDP MPP Muskoka-Georgian Bay 1990–1995, ran for Ontario Liberals 2003 in Parry Sound-Muskoka
Lenore Zann - a Nova Scotia MLA, who left the Nova Scotia NDP to run as a federal Liberal Party candidate in the upcoming federal election, while continuing to serve as an Independent MLA in the province for the time being.

New Democratic Party members who left to start their own parties
Sidney Green - Winnipeg Lawyer, Manitoba NDP MLA in the 1960s/1970s, ran for Manitoba NDP leadership in 1969 as the radical leftist candidate, In 1979 he declared at an NDP convention, claiming "the trade union movement and militant feminists" had taken control of the party. In 1981 he started the Progressive Party of Manitoba with 2 other NDP MLAs Ben Hanuschak and Bud Boyce.
Ted W. Kulp - former NDP candidate, founder and only candidate of the Forward Canada Party in the 1997 federal election.
James Laxer - Runner-up at the 1971 NDP federal leadership convention and leader of The Waffle with Mel Watkins, left the NDP with the Waffle in 1972 to form the Movement for an Independent Socialist Canada as an independent party. Rejoined the NDP in the 1980s.
Paul MacEwan - Nova Scotia NDP MLA in the 1970s, ran 4 times as NDP (1967-1970-1974-1978), once as independent (1981), then he started the Cape Breton Labour Party and ran once (1984), then again as independent (1988), then three times as a Liberal. (1993-1998-1999)
Murdoch MacKay - Manitoba NDP President in the 1970s, left to co-found the Progressive Party of Manitoba.

New Democratic Party to none/no public support
Buzz Hargrove CAW president and long-time NDP supporter, expelled from the NDP in 2006 after endorsing several Liberal candidates since 1999.
Canadian Auto Workers disaffiliated from the NDP following Buzz Hargrove's expulsion.
David Miller long-time NDP Toronto city councillor and federal and provincial NDP candidate. Elected mayor of Toronto while an NDP member in 2004. Allowed NDP membership to lapse in 2007.

New Democratic Party to Tories/other provincial Conservative parties
Brian Ashton - Toronto City Councillor, former NDPer who lost the nomination for the NDP in a Scarborough riding, and later became a Red Tory.
Garry Breitkreuz – Conservative MP, was previously a New Democratic Party member and supporter 
Dennis Fentie - Premier of Yukon, former Yukon NDP MLA - he quit the NDP and a few months later became Premier of the Yukon for the right wing Yukon Party.  (Source - CBC News, Yukon Election coverage)
Peter Fenwick - former Newfoundland NDP leader, & first NDP elected to Newfoundland Assembly in 1984. He ran for the Canadian Alliance in 2000.
Peter North - NDP MPP Elgin 1990–1993, became independent after trying to become a PC party member but instead being rebuffed by Mike Harris's PCs, re-elected in 1995.
Angela Vautour - 1st elected as an NDP MP in New Brunswick in 1997, switched to the PCs in September 1999.  She lost her riding to a Liberal in 2000.  Ran again for the New Conservatives in 2004.  (Source - Public Records ; Elections Canada) 
Ryan Cleary - NDP MP for St. John's South—Mount Pearl from 2011 to 2015, ran for the Progressive Conservative Party of Newfoundland and Labrador in Windsor Lake in the 2015 provincial election and was defeated.
Dominic Cardy - leader of the New Brunswick New Democratic Party from 2011 to 2017, quit as both party leader and member on January 1, 2017. He joined the New Brunswick Progressive Conservative Party later in the month as  strategic issues director.

New Democratic Party to Greens
Dan Biocchi - Green Party candidate in 2004 for Ottawa-Orleans. He was an NDP member and the Executive Assistant to former NDP MP Cid Samson.
Marc Emery - Marijuana activist.  Emery has been a public supporter of the New Democratic Party from 2003 to 2015 as a result of Jack Layton's support for the decriminalization of marijuana.  In the 2009 BC provincial election, Emery supported the Green Party of British Columbia. His wife, Jodie Emery, was the BC Green candidate in Vancouver-Fraserview., Emery subsequently joined the Conservative Party of Canada in order to support Maxime Bernier's leadership candidacy. 
Bruce Hyer - First elected as an NDP MP (Thunder Bay—Superior North) in 2008, he quit the party to sit as an independent in 2012 before joining the Green Party in 2013. Hyer was the second Green MP to sit in Parliament. He was defeated by Liberal candidate Patty Hajdu in the 2015 federal election. 
Peter Ittinuar - former NDP MP for Nunavut, Green Party candidate for Nunavut in the 2008 federal election.
Paul Manly - The son of former New Democratic Party MP Jim Manly, he originally sought the NDP nomination in Nanaimo—Ladysmith for the 2015 federal election, but was blocked from standing due to his stance with the Israeli-Palestinian conflict. He subsequently joined the Green Party, and stood as their candidate in both 2015, where he placed fourth, and the 2019 by-election, where he was elected (becoming the second elected Green MP).
Pierre Nantel - following revelations that he had been in private talks to cross the floor to another political party, he was removed from caucus and deselected as a candidate in the upcoming 2019 election. Days later, he announced he joined the Green Party while remaining as a sited Independent in Parliament before the next federal election begins and would run as their candidate in the 2019 election.

New Democratic Party to Social Credit
Frank Calder - Longtime BC NDP MLA, switched to SoCred in 1975. He lost by 1 vote to NDP candidate Al Passerall in 1979.
Al Passarell - BC NDP MLA for Atlin crossed to Social Credit in 1985.

New Democratic Party to Bloc Québécois/Parti Québécois
Denis Lazure - ran for federal NDP twice in the 1960s, elected as a PQ MNA in the 1970s.
Claude Patry - NDP MP crossed the floor to the Bloc in 2013.
Rémy Trudel - NDP candidate in 1988 federal election, later served as PQ MNA and cabinet minister.

New Democratic Party to other
Jean-François Larose - left the NDP to help form the new party Strength in Democracy.
Neil Reynolds - former NDP supporter, gained a party record 13% running for the Libertarian Party of Canada in a by-election, later became party leader.

Green Party

Greens to New Democratic Party
Stuart Parker - former BC Green Party leader, switched to the NDP and is running for the provincial NDP nomination in the Ontario riding of St. Paul's.
Joan Russow - former leader of the Green Party of Canada 1997–2001.  Joined NDP in September 2003.

Greens to Liberals

Jenica Atwin - Elected as MP for Fredericton in 2019, crossed the floor to the Liberal Party in 2021.
Briony Penn - former long-time Green Party member, ran as Liberal candidate for Saanich-Gulf Islands in 2008.

Greens to Parti Québécois/Bloc Québécois
Scott McKay - former Parti vert du Québec leader, running for PQ in 2008 Quebec provincial election.
Jean Ouimet - former Parti vert du Québec leader, later ran for PQ leadership.
Jacques Rivard - former Deputy Leader of the Green Party of Canada.

Greens to Conservative parties
Joe Anglin - interim leader of the Alberta Greens (2009), later joined the Wildrose Party in 2012 and was elected an MLA. Became in independent in 2014, and announced that he would seek the Progressive Conservative nomination in his riding in 2015.

Bloc Québécois/Parti Québécois

Bloc Québécois/Parti Québécois to Tories/Other provincial conservative parties
Richard Bélisle - former Bloc MP, ran later for the Canadian Alliance and Conservatives.
Pierre Brien - BQ MP, ran for the ADQ in 2003.
Jean Landry - Bloc MP elected 1993 for Lotbinere, he ran as an independent in 1997 losing badly. He ran as a Conservative in 2004 coming in 2nd (20,000 to 10,000). Is now a member of the NDP and was a delegate at their Quebec-Section council in 2011 in Alma.
Denis Lebel - former Bloc member, joined the Conservatives in 2007
Nic LeBlanc - PC MP 1984–1992 for Longueuil, than become Bloc MP 1992–1997. Ran for Canadian Alliance in 2000, and Conservatives in 2004
Michel Rivard - former Parti MNA, joined the Canadian Alliance under Stockwell Day, appointed to the Senate as a Conservative by Stephen Harper.
Michel Gauthier - former Parti Québécois MNA, former Bloc Québécois MP and leader, joined the Conservative Party in 2018.

Bloc Québécois/Parti Québécois to Liberals
Robert Lanctôt - Bloc MP turned Liberal MP in 2003 and lost in 2004.
Jean Lapierre - Liberal MP, who co-founded the Bloc Québécois and sat as a Bloc MP.  He later rejoined the Liberal Party and served as a cabinet minister.
Réjean Hébert - former Parti Québécois MNA and former provincial Minister of Health, ran unsuccessfully for the Liberal Party of Canada in the 2019 Canadian federal election in Longueuil—Saint-Hubert.

Bloc Québécois/Parti Québécois to other
André Bellavance - quits the party in 2014 to sit as an independent.
Jean-François Fortin - former interim parliamentary leader quits the party in 2014 to sit as an independent, subsequently forms and becomes leader of Strength in Democracy with Jean-François Larose.
Amir Khadir - former BQ candidate, current Québec solidaire MNA and former party co-spokesperson.
Ghislain Lebel - former Bloc MP, left the party to set as an independent, voted for and offered himself as a candidate for the ADQ in the 2007 Quebec election, joined the Parti indépendantiste in 2008.
Maria Mourani - Bloc MP for Ahuntsic is expelled from the party in 2013 for opposing the Quebec Charter of Values. After sitting as an Independent for a year, she becomes a member of the NDP, while continuing to sit as an Independent, and announces her intention to run as an NDP candidate in the next election.

Social Credit

Social Credit to Liberals
Armand Caouette - Social Credit MP in the 1970s, ran as a PC in the 1997 federal election, Liberal in the 2006 election.
Marcel Lessard - Social Credit MP 1962–1963, elected as a Liberal in 1968.
Harold Long - Social Credit BC MLA, later a BC Liberal MLA.
Horace Andrew (Bud) Olson - Social Credit MP (1957–1958, 1962–1968), re-elected as a Liberal in 1968.
Claude Richmond - Social Credit BC MLA, switched to the BC Liberals.

Social Credit to Progressive Conservative
Kim Campbell - BC Socred, later PC Prime Minister.
Robert N. Thompson - Social Credit leader from 1961 to 1967, re-elected as a Progressive Conservative in 1968.

Social Credit to NDP
Rafe Mair - former BC Socred MLA, later supported the BC Greens, supported the BC NDP in 2009.
René Matte - Ralliement Créditiste/Social Credit MP, later ran as an NDP candidate.

Social Credit to others
Elmer Knutson - defeated Social Credit leadership candidate, founded Confederation of Regions Party.

Progressive Party/United Farmers

Progressives/United Farmers to Liberals
Preston Elliott - Progressive MP, member of "Ginger Group" who joined the Liberals.
Harry Nixon - UF/Progressive MPP in Ontario, joined Ontario Liberal Party, briefly served as Premier.
William John Ward - Progressive MP, member of "Ginger Group" who joined the Liberals.

Progressives/United Farmers to CCF
Milton Neil Campbell - Progressive MP, part of "Ginger Group" which played major role in forming the CCF.
George Gibson Coote - Alberta United Farmers MP, founding member of CCF.
Robert Gardiner - Progressive MP, part of "Ginger Group" which played major role in forming the CCF.
Edward Joseph Garland- UF and Progressive MP, part of "Ginger Group" which played major role in forming the CCF.
William Charles Good - Progressive MP, part of "Ginger Group" which played major role in forming the CCF.
Donald MacBeth Kennedy - UF and Progressive MP, part of "Ginger Group" which played major role in forming the CCF.
Agnes Macphail - one of the first elected female MPs, later joined CCF.
Henry Elvins Spencer - UF MP, part of "Ginger Group" which played major role in forming the CCF.

Progressives/United Farmers to Conservatives
John Bracken - Progressive Party Premier of Manitoba, because federal Conservative leader after the party agreed to change the party name to Progressive Conservative.

Other

Communists to all others
Judy Darcy - former NDP candidate and head of CUPE, member of Workers' Communist Party in youth.
Gilles Duceppe - Bloc Québécois leader, was in the Workers' Communist Party (Marxist–Leninist) as a youth.
Paula Fletcher - Communist Party candidate in the 1980s, now an NDP affiliated city councillor in Toronto.
Robert Laxer - Labor-Progressive Party organizer in the 1950s, left in 1956 and subsequently joined the New Democratic Party becoming a leader of The Waffle tendency.
A. A. MacLeod - Labor-Progressive MPP in the Ontario legislature in the 1940s and 1950s. Subsequently, became an advisor to the Ontario Progressive Conservative Party.
Anne McGrath - former NDP president, ran as a Communist Party candidate in the 1980s.
Roland Penner - Labor-Progressive Party candidate as a youth in 1953. Was elected for the Manitoba NDP in 1980 and served as a provincial cabinet minister.
Mathieu Ravignat - Communist Party-affiliated as an independent candidate in 1997, elected NDP MP for Pontiac in 2011.

Marijuana Party to NDP
Dana Larsen - former BC Marijuana Party leader, ran for the NDP in 2008.

Marijuana Party to Liberals
Marc-Boris St-Maurice - founder and leader of Marijuana Party of Canada, joined the Liberals in 2005.

See also

List of Canadian politicians who have crossed the floor

Notes

External links
Members of the House of Commons who Crossed the Floor of the House of Commons or who Changed Parties (Parliament of Canada)

Political parties in Canada
Lists of Canadian politicians